Charlotte Conant Fox (10 May 1957 – 24 May 2018) was an American mountaineer and the first American woman to reach the summit of three 8,000 meter peaks. She survived the 1996 Mount Everest disaster as a member of Scott Fischer's Mountain Madness expedition. She died of head injuries on May 24, 2018, after falling over a stairway railing at her house.

References

1957 births
2018 deaths
American mountain climbers